The Association of Representatives of the Bunyoro-Kitara Kingdom CLBG (ARKBK) is a non-profit charity and NGO in the West-Ugandan kingdom of Bunyoro-Kitara. It was established by royal charter on August 27, 2009 by Omukama ("King") Solomon Iguru I and is incorporated under the Ugandan Companies Act. Its purpose is to promote the Kingdom internationally and to support development programs for the region. The organisation aims to remain neutral in regards to political and religious matters.

The ARKBK's main director is the King of Bunyoro. The ARKBK is managed by its President and governed by its board of directors.

Objectives 
The primary objective of the ARKBK is to develop the Bunyoro-Kitara area into a prosperous region of Africa through public relations, active development work, support of other corporations' development work, promotion of the area's financial opportunities to encourage corporate investment and generally carry out tasks set out by the King of Bunyoro.

Membership 
Members of the association must be approved personally by the King of Bunyoro, must sign a 9-point declaration and must provide a clean police record, copy of their passport, curriculum vitae and other documents. Most members work alone in their home country to make contacts for the King and to obtain donations in cash and materials that can be used for developing the region.

There are several different ranks within the ARKBK, explained below and as can be seen in the adjacent diagram:
 King - Royal Patron and top executive chief of the association
 Advisor to the King - Personal advisor and assistant for the King. (normally only President of the ARKBK or similar)
 Aide-de-Camp - Personal assistant for the King. Most representatives and above are Aide-de-Camps, should the King visit their home country
 President - Elected/appointed by the King and is in charge of daily management
 Special Councilor for the President - Assistant and advisor for the president
 Representative - The usual rank for persons who are members of the ARKBK and work alone in their own country. In larger countries the representative will be the main leader for the ARKBK in that nation, and may have several chiefs under his command
 County Chief
 Parish Chief
 Sub-Parish Chief
 Village Chief

Focal points 
The ARKBK seeks to help develop four main areas; Living conditions, Education, Accessibility (both physically in the Kingdom but also via internet) and Natural resources (e.g. exploitation of crude oil deposits, afforestation and farming). In these areas, the King has pointed out several areas of interest/focus:

Awards and institutions of the ARKBK 
The ARKBK has several awards and institutions:

Medal of Honor 
The Medal of Honor may be awarded by the President to anyone within the organisation who has done a great deal of work to promote the Kingdom and the association.

Hospitality Industry Award 

The Hospitality Industry Award is a royal seal of approval given to companies that specialize in hospitality. The award is meant to encourage the Ugandan hospitality industry to continue its development and bring tourism to the Kingdom.

The award is not exclusive to Uganda but may be awarded to a member of the hospitality industry anywhere in the world. The award can also be given as an honorary award to companies with outstanding merit and who have done remarkable work to promote tourism.

The award plaque has the logo of the Hospitality Industry Award, a golden pineapple, and the motto of the award "Quality – Inspired".

Goodwill program 
The ARKBK, and also the Kingdom, has a goodwill program primarily intended for public figures (e.g. politicians, actors) who actively wish to support the work of ARKBK and the development of the Kingdom. A goodwill officer of the Kingdom does not have any powers or responsibilities in the Kingdom. The title is an honor which may be used to promote oneself and the Kingdom. There are different ranks that may be applied for (e.g. Goodwill Ambassador, Goodwill Consul), each with its own processing fee that goes primarily to charity.

Royal Orders 
Currently the Kingdom has three Royal Orders and a hall of fame as listed below.

 The Royal Order of the Omujwaara Kondo is the highest Order of the Kingdom
 The Royal Order of the Engabu is the second highest order of the Kingdom and is only given for exceptional service
 The Most Honorable Order of Omukama Chwa II Kabalega is the third highest order of merit of the Kingdom and is given for service to the Kingdom
 The Hall of Fame of the Bunyoro-Kitara Kingdom is a special honor that gives the recipient a special place in a royal museum (not yet constructed)

Royal Warrant Holder Society 
Royal Warrants are a mark of recognition to regular suppliers of goods and services to the Royal Household of the Kingdom Bunyoro-Kitara. The decision to award Royal Warrants is made only by the King. All details regarding the use of the Royal Warrant are regulated by separate rules and contracts. The award is normally valid for 5 years and must then be re-awarded. The award is given to a specific person (Grantee) of a corporation, and this person is solely responsible for the proper use of the award.

Royal purveyors are entitled to use the Royal Coat of Arms and the text "By appointment to HM Omukama Rukirabasaija Agutamba Solomon Gafabusa Iguru I" on their products.

Royal Society of the Kingdom of Bunyoro-Kitara 
The Royal Society is meant to bring together scientists of the world, and especially Uganda, to help improve the economy and living conditions of the Ugandan and Bunyoro people.

References

External links 
 Kingdom of Bunyoro-Kitara and ARKBK website

Bunyoro
Non-profit organisations based in Uganda